The Men's team épée event of the 2011 World Fencing Championships took place on October 15, 2011.

Medalists

Draw

Finals

Top half

Section 1

Section 2

Bottom half

Section 3

Section 4

Placement matches

5–8th place

9–12th place

13–16th place

External links
 Bracket

2011 World Fencing Championships